Morion is a genus of beetles in the family Carabidae, containing the following species:

 Morion angustus Chaudoir, 1880
 Morion aridus Allen, 1968
 Morion attenuatus Barker, 1922
 Morion australis Castelnau, 1867
 Morion baloghi Horvatovich, 1976
 Morion biroi Horvatovich, 1976
 Morion bithynicus Schauberger, 1925
 Morion boliviensis Allen, 1968
 Morion boninensis Kasahara & Sato, 1990
 Morion brasiliensis Dejean, 1825
 Morion brevior Putzeys, 1873
 Morion caledoniae Fauvel, 1903
 Morion congoensis Straneo, 1959
 Morion constrictus Chaudoir, 1880
 Morion cordatus Chaudoir, 1837
 Morion costiger Darlington, 1934
 Morion crassipes Sloane, 1904
 Morion cucujoides Walker, 1858
 Morion cyclomus Chaudoir, 1854
 Morion dalbertisi Chaudoir, 1880
 Morion doriae Putzeys, 1873
 Morion germanus Chaudoir, 1880
 Morion guineensis Imhoff, 1843
 Morion humeratus Chaudoir, 1880
 Morion japonicus Bates, 1883
 Morion jordani Csiki, 1929
 Morion lafertei Guerin-Meneville, 1844
 Morion longicollis W.J.MacLeay, 1871
 Morion longipennis Putzeys, 1875
 Morion luzonicus Chaudoir, 1852
 Morion monilicornis (Latreille, 1806)
 Morion novaehollandiae Castelnau, 1867
 Morion olympicus L.Redtenbacher, 1843
 Morion orientalis Dejean, 1825
 Morion pachysomus Chaudoir, 1880
 Morion parallelus Klug, 1832
 Morion piceus Castelnau, 1867
 Morion polynesiae Fairmaire, 1878
 Morion simplex Dejean, 1826
 Morion simulatus Jordan, 1894
 Morion victoriae Castelnau, 1867

References

Pterostichinae
Carabidae genera